Spea hammondii, also known as the western spadefoot, western spadefoot toad, Hammond's spadefoot, or Hammond's spadefoot toad, is a species of amphibian in the family Scaphiopodidae.  It is found in western California (USA) and northwestern Baja California (Mexico). The specific name hammondii is in honor of physician and naturalist William Alexander Hammond.

Description
Spea hammondii is a relatively smooth-skinned species of American spadefoot toad. Its eyes are pale gold with vertical pupils. It has a green or grey dorsum, often with skin tubercles tipped in orange, and has a whitish color on the abdomen. On each hind foot is a wedge-shaped black spade. Juveniles have a similar appearance to adults, but with more distinct spotting.

Distribution
Populations of Spea hammondii are localized, but widespread. It ranges throughout the central valley of California and as far south as San Diego and some parts of the desert. The western spadefoot prefers grassland, scrub and chaparral locally but can occur in oak woodlands. It is nocturnal, and activity is limited to the wet season, summer storms, or during evenings with elevated substrate moisture levels. It is easily handled, with less skin secretions than similar toad species. Their secretions smell like peanut butter and may cause sneezing.
The western spadefoot is experiencing some habitat loss, but is still common in its range and the population declines are very minor even though it is listed as "near threatened" in some counties of CA.

Diet
Tadpoles feed mainly on plants and planktonic organisms, algae, ants, small invertebrates and dead aquatic larvae of amphibians, they may become cannibalistic. Adult toads feed on insects, worms and other invertebrates including; grasshoppers, true bugs, moths, ground beetles, ladybird beetles, click beetles, spiders, flies, ants and earthworms.

Life span and reproduction
The average life span for Spea hammondii is about 12 years. They reach sexual maturity in their third year. The female spadefoot toad will lay up to 2,000 eggs per season. The cordon of eggs attaches to objects in the water or puddles or ditches and the male deposits sperm on them. Tadpoles emerge in as little as 15 hours. After hatching, the tadpole's only chance for survival is to develop into a toad before the puddle dries up, which takes 12 to 13 days. This is the fastest metamorphosis known for any frog or toad. Reproduction: the breeding of laying eggs normally occur from late winter to the end of March. Males will be heard during this period. Females lay numerous small, irregular clusters that will contain from 10 up to 42 eggs. They may lay more than 500 eggs in one season. Eggs hatching happens rapidly within two weeks.

Spawning stage
A male toad finds the female and jumps on her back, a process called amplexus. As the female lays eggs in a long chain (cordon), the male fertilizes them. The group of eggs is called spawn. [The yolk within the egg splits into two sections. This splits again to create four sections and continues splitting. After this the embryo begins to develop, it starts looking like a tadpole. You can see it swim in the egg, feeding on the yolk to survive.
Tadpole Stage. Eggs will hatch in 6–21 days. The tadpole does not swim for the first 7 to 10 days, but floats around in the plants. It breathes through external gills. Four weeks into the process, the skin grows over the gills and they become internal gills. Six to nine weeks after hatching, the tadpole grows legs, but keeps its tail. The tadpole enters youth and adulthood between weeks 9–12, the tail shortens. Front legs begin to grow and the lungs develop. At week 12 the toad looks like other toads, only much smaller. It does not leave the water until somewhere between 12 and 16 weeks after hatching. It will return again later to mate and fertilize more eggs. Until then, it lives away from water, eating insects and other bugs.

References

 This article is based on a description from "A Field Guide to the Reptiles and Amphibians of Coastal Southern California", Robert N. Fisher and Ted J. Case, USGS, https://pubs.er.usgs.gov/publication/81502

hammondii
Amphibians of Mexico
Amphibians of the United States
Fauna of the California chaparral and woodlands
Natural history of Baja California
Natural history of the Central Valley (California)
Endangered fauna of California
Amphibians described in 1859
Taxa named by Spencer Fullerton Baird